Michael E. Gronstal (born January 29, 1950) is a former Iowa State Senator who represented the 8th district in the Iowa Senate. He served from 1985 to 2017 and was the majority leader and chairman of the Rules and Administration committee. He was also chairman of the Democratic Legislative Campaign Committee (DLCC), the national organization to elect Democratic state legislators.

Personal life and education 
Gronstal was born on January 29, 1950. He received his B.A. from Antioch College. Gronstal and his wife, Connie, have two daughters: Kate, who is a transportation engineer at Stantec in Chicago; and Sara, who is currently Director of Forensics at Eastern Illinois University.

Political career
Gronstal was re-elected in 2004 with 12,480 votes (54%), defeating Republican opponent Loren Knauss. He won re-election again in 2008 with 58% of the votes.

Prior to serving in the Senate, he served one term in the Iowa House of Representatives. He also served as the chair of the Pottawattamie County Democratic Party from 1986 to 1988. 

Gronstal supported efforts to increase renewable fuels in Iowa and in 2006, Iowa passed the nation's strongest ethanol legislation. Gronstal also supported legislation to increase funding for community colleges and school districts. 

After the Iowa Supreme Court ruled in favor of gay marriage in the Varnum v. Brien decision in April 2009, Gronstal blocked a Republican attempt to overturn the Court's decision with a constitutional amendment. He released a YouTube video in which he quoted his daughter's statement that opponents of same-sex marriage in Iowa had already lost because her generation does not care about the issue.

Gronstal lost his bid for re-election in 2016, and was replaced by Republican Dan Dawson. As of 2022, he is a lobbyist for the Iowa State Building and Construction Trades.

References

External links
Senator Michael E. Gronstal official Iowa Legislature site
Senator Michael E. Gronstal official Iowa General Assembly site
State Senator Mike Gronstal official constituency site
 

|-

|-

|-

1950 births
Antioch College alumni
Democratic Party Iowa state senators
Living people
Democratic Party members of the Iowa House of Representatives
Politicians from Council Bluffs, Iowa
21st-century American politicians